This is a list of people who were born, were raised, or have lived in The Woodlands, Texas.

Arts, media, and entertainment 

 Kevin Abstract — rapper, singer-songwriter, director and founder of boy band Brockhampton
 Kirby Bliss Blanton — actress, known for role in 2012 film Project X
 Will Butler — brother of Win Butler and core member of Arcade Fire
 Win Butler — brother of Will Butler and frontman for the Grammy Award-winning Canadian indie rock group Arcade Fire
 Hayes Carll — country musician
 Chamillionaire — rapper
 Jack Ingram — country musician
 Parker McCollum — country musician

Athletics 

 Danny Amendola — NFL player, Houston Texans, 2-time Super Bowl champion
 Trevor Bauer — MLB player, Los Angeles Dodgers, winner of National League's 2020 Cy Young Award
 Lance Blanks — retired NBA player
 Matt Bullard — retired NBA player
 KJ Choi — PGA Tour Golfer
 Kassidy Cook — Olympic Diver
 Jim Deshaies — former Major League Baseball pitcher; announcer for the Chicago Cubs
 Doug Drabek — MLB player, winner of National League's 1990 Cy Young Award
 Kyle Drabek — MLB player, son of Doug Drabek
 Brett Eibner — MLB player
 Arian Foster — retired NFL player, 4-time Pro Bowl, 1-time All-Pro
 Justin Gilbert — NFL player, Cleveland Browns
 Paul Goldschmidt — MLB player, St Louis Cardinals, high school teammate of Kyle Drabek
 Quentin Grimes — an American college basketball player for the Kansas Jayhawks
 Chad Hedrick — retired Winter Olympian, 5-time medalist long track speed skating, most decorated inline world champion
 Gerald Irons — retired NFL player for Cleveland Browns and Oakland Raiders
 Larry Izzo — retired NFL linebacker; assistant coach for Seattle Seahawks
 Daniel Lasco — NFL player
 Paul Levesque — retired professional wrestler and businessman
 Stacy Lewis — LPGA golfer, 2011 Kraft Nabisco champion; 2012 LPGA Player of the Year
 Jeff Maggert — PGA Senior Tour golfer, top-5 finishes in Masters, U.S. Open, British Open and PGA Championship
 Stephanie McMahon — retired professional wrestler and businesswoman
 Nick Mitchell — former professional wrestler
 Brad North — MLS player
 Chris Paul — NBA player, Phoenix Suns
 Adrian Peterson — NFL player, Detroit Lions, 2007 Offensive Rookie of the Year, 2012 MVP, 4-time All-Pro, 7-time Pro Bowl
 Rusty Pierce — retired MLS player
 Brennan Poole — race car driver
 Austin Pruitt — MLB pitcher, Tampa Bay Rays
 Patrick Reed — PGA Tour golfer, winner of the 2018 Masters Tournament
 Jameson Taillon — baseball player, drafted 2nd overall by Pittsburgh Pirates in 2010 MLB Draft
 Laura Wilkinson — 2000 Olympic champion, first gold medal for female American platform diver since 1964
 Torrie Wilson — retired professional wrestler, fitness competitor and model; co-owner of the fashion boutique "Officially Jaded" in Market Street
 Ellis Wyms — retired NFL player

Business and industry 

 George Bishop — founder and CEO, GeoSouthern Energy
 Greg Brenneman — Chairman, President and CEO of the private equity firm CCMP, former CEO of Burger King
 Roy C. Strickland — businessman and politician

Government and the law 

 Kevin Brady — former Republican U.S. Representative for Texas's 8th congressional district
 Mark Keough — Republican State Representative for District 15 of the Texas House of Representatives, businessman, Christian pastor, radio host, and educator
 Steve Toth — former Republican State Representative for District 15 of the Texas House of Representatives (2013–2015, 2019-Present), businessman

References 

Woodlands
The Woodlands